Krugersdorp (Afrikaans for Kruger's Town) is a mining city in the West Rand, Gauteng Province, South Africa founded in 1887 by Marthinus Pretorius and Abner Cohen. Following the discovery of gold on the Witwatersrand, a need arose for a major town in the west of the reef. The government bought part of the Paardekraal farm and named the new town after the Transvaal president, Paul Kruger. Krugersdorp no longer has a separate municipal government after it was integrated into Mogale City Local Municipality along with surrounding towns. It is now the seat of government for Mogale City.

History

Krugersdorp is the site of a December 1880 gathering at which more than 6,000 men vowed to fight for the Transvaal's independence. Founded in 1887 by Marthinus Pretorius after the discovery of gold on his farm, Paardekraal, thereafter the mining industry played an important role in the development of the city. Two important events in the history of South Africa: the Transvaal War of Independence (1881) and the discovery of the Witwatersrand Goldfields (1886) took place in Krugersdorp. These events had far-reaching political and economic consequences for the country's development.

In April 1887, the South African Republic's (ZAR) Executive Council purchased part of the farm Paarderkraal to build a town called Krugersdorp. By the time the town was founded, the existence of the gold reef along the Witwatersrand had become common knowledge, and thousands seeking their fortunes pitched their tents and pegged claims. In 1888, Krugersdorp was proclaimed a separate gold field. By 1895, the proclaimed goldfields was separated from Krugersdorp, and the town and Distriksdorp, near the monument, were merged in April that year. By 1903, Krugersdorp became a municipality.

During the Second Boer War (1899-1902), the British built a concentration camp in the valley that is now occupied by the Centenary Dam. This camp was overlooked by the "D" Shaft of the Luipardsvlei Estate Gold Mining Company, which was shut down in 1929 when mining shifted to deeper ore bodies that offered the prospect of larger tonnages.  this shaft is being brought back into production. Part of the heritage of the area will feature in a museum to be built post-closure. An essential part of the museum's content will be the Boer War legacy.

In 1952, the West Rand Consolidated Mine was the first in the world to extract uranium as a byproduct of the gold refining process.

Demographics
Krugersdorp is home to the South African Branch of Jehovah's Witnesses, The Watchtower Bible and Tract Society.

In 2010, the town's Coronation Park area received international exposure for the depiction of Afrikaner poverty by Finbarr O'Reilly. In 2014 the area was exposed again as a subject of the BBC documentary Reggie Yates' Extreme South Africa: White Slums.

Economy

Gold, manganese, iron, asbestos and lime are all mined in the area.

Krugersdorp has a modern business centre and shopping malls alongside many smaller shops, schools, and necessary amenities. There are also game reserves and a nearby bird sanctuary.

Krugersdorp is served by the Jack Taylor Airfield which is easily accessible from Pretoria via the R28/N14 highway, and more commonly by the N1 highway, Lanseria International Airport on the R511 which is used for travel to Pretoria, and OR Tambo International Airport which is South Africa's main international airport located in Johannesburg.

The nearby  Krugersdorp Game Reserve in the dense bush of the veld holds a large quantity of game and is one of the city's major tourist attractions. Also in close proximity are various provincial heritage sites including the Cradle of Humankind and its Sterkfontein Caves and the Wonder Cave.

Law and government

Government

Name change
Although the city's municipality changed its name from Krugersdorp to Mogale City, the assumption that the city's name has been officially changed to Mogale City has been refuted by the Mogale City Municipality

Coat of Arms
Krugersdorp was proclaimed a municipality in 1903.  By 1931, the municipal council had assumed a pseudo-heraldic coat of arms. The shield was divided by a horizontal line, the upper half subdivided by a vertical line, the three sections depicting (1) the Paardekraal monument, (2) a mining landscape, and (3) a plough.  The motto was Labor omnia vincit improbus.

A proper coat of arms was designed in the 1960s.  It was registered with the Transvaal Provincial Administration in November 1965 and at the Bureau of Heraldry in January 1969. The arms were : Per chevron ploye Azure and Or, dexter two mine hammers in saltire and sinister a cogwheel all Or, and in base the Paardekraal Monument Gules.  In layman's terms, the shield was divided by a curved chevron-shaped line into blue and gold, displaying two crossed mine hammers and a cogwheel at the top, and the Paardekraal monument at the bottom. The crest was three horses' heads issuing from a golden mural crown; the supporters were an eland and a gemsbok; and the motto was Labor omnia vincit improbus.

Attractions
Krugersdorp has popular tourist attractions such as Krugersdorp Game Reserve, Maropeng Visitor Centre, Walter Sisulu Botanical Gardens and Sterkfonten Caves.

The town is the host of the annual Gauteng Beach Party held at Coronation Park. In recent years the event has featured performances by:
DJ Sbu
DJ Cleo
Winnie Khumalo
TBo Touch
TKZee
Brown Dash

Afropop sensation Mafikizolo and Ntando Bangani are noted acts that hail from Krugersdorp.

Sports
Krugersdorp also has an 18-hole golf course and many facilities for extreme sports.

Infrastructure

Health

Local clinics
Central Clinic
Kagiso Clinic B
Azaadville Clinic
Munsieville Clinic A
Dr Kaka Clinic

Provincial hospitals
Dr Yusuf Dadoo Hospital (Paardekraal)
Sterkfontein Hospital
Leratong Hospital

Private hospitals
Krugersdorp Private Hospital
Bell Street Day Hospital
Netcare Pinehaven Hospital
Medi-Cross Clinic

Education
The schools in Krugersdorp include:

Alma Mater International School
 Krugersdorp High School
Town View High School
Thuto-Lefa Secondary School
Hoërskool Monument
Hoërskool Jan De Klerk
HTS Nic Diederichs
St Ursula's School
Hoërskool Noordheuwel
Hoërskool Bastion
Laerskool Muldersdrif
Laerskool Kenmare
Rant en Dal School for learners with Autism and SID
Hoërskool Pro-Practicum
Laerskool Millennium
Laerskool Ebenhaeser
Curro Krugersdorp Private School
Laerskool Paardekraal
Monument Primary School
Laerskool Krugersdorp Noord
Ahmed Timol Secondary School
Azaadville Muslim School
Silverfields Primary School 
Tina Cowley Reading Centre Krugersdorp

Notable people
Yusuf Dadoo
Johannes de Klerk
Hanno Dirksen
Jaque Fourie
Costa Gazi
Allan Heyl
Mmusi Maimane
Nomvula Mokonyane
Scott Spedding
Lucien van der Walt
Brad Binder

See also
 Krugersdorp Nature Reserve

References

External links

 The Big Picture photo essay on white squatters in Krugersdorp
 Meet the white squatters of Munsiville, Gauteng

Populated places in the Mogale City Local Municipality
Uranium mining
Populated places founded by Afrikaners
Mining communities in South Africa
Second Boer War concentration camps
Populated places established in 1887
1887 establishments in the South African Republic